Palfrey is an occupational surname, denoting a person responsible for the maintenance and provision of saddle horses.
Notable people with the surname include:

Daf Palfrey (born 1973), Welsh television, film and video director, producer and writer
Deborah Jeane Palfrey (1956–2008), operated an escort agency in Washington, D.C., convicted in 2008 of racketeering, money laundering, etc.
Francis Winthrop Palfrey (1831–1889), American historian, born in Boston, Massachusetts son of J. G. Palfrey
John G. Palfrey (1796–1881), American clergyman and historian who served as a U.S. Representative from Massachusetts
John Palfrey (born 1972), faculty co-director of the Berkman Center for Internet & Society at Harvard Law School
Judith Palfrey (born 1943), the T. Berry Brazelton Professor of Pediatrics at Harvard Medical School
Lisa Palfrey, Welsh television actress best known for playing the character of Rhiannedd Frost in the Welsh soap Pobol y Cwm
Sarah Palfrey Cooke (1912–1996), female tennis player from the United States
Sean Palfrey (born 1968), Welsh professional darts player who currently plays in the Professional Darts Corporation
Simon Palfrey, English Scholar at Oxford University and a Fellow in English at Brasenose College, Oxford University
Stephen Palfrey Webb (1804–1879), 3rd & 12th Mayor of Salem, Massachusetts (1842–1845, 1860–1862) and 6th Mayor of San Francisco (1854–1855)
Thomas Palfrey (born 1953), currently (as of 2007) the Flintridge Professor of Economics and Political Science at the California Institute of Technology
William Palfrey (1741–1780), American Patriot born in Boston, Massachusetts
Yolande Palfrey (1957–2011), British actress

See also
Mr. Palfrey of Westminster, British television drama which ran in 1984–85
Mrs. Palfrey at the Claremont, 2005 comedy-drama film made by Claremont Films

English-language surnames
Occupational surnames
English-language occupational surnames